Pulborough railway station serves the West Sussex village of Pulborough. It is at the western end of the village, just off the A283 road. It is  down the line from  via .

History
Four years later a link was made to the Brighton to Portsmouth line; the new line diverged from the Petworth branch at Hardham Junction just south of Pulborough.

Three platform faces were provided: a Down side platform on which the main station buildings stood, and an island platform whose western face was used by Midhurst line trains. By World War II, these terminated at Pulborough rather than running to Horsham or beyond. Goods facilities and a cattle market were provided.

The goods yard was closed in the mid-1960s and converted into a car park, and the goods shed is now a car repair centre. The station buildings, including a large, wide canopy on the island platform, remain largely unchanged but only two platform faces are now in use. The former up loop line used by Midhurst line trains has been removed.

Services
All services at Pulborough are operated by Southern using  EMUs.

The typical off-peak service in trains per hour is:
 2 tph to  via 
 2 tph to 

Gallery

References

External links

Horsham District
Railway stations in West Sussex
DfT Category D stations
Former London, Brighton and South Coast Railway stations
Railway stations in Great Britain opened in 1859
Railway stations served by Govia Thameslink Railway